The Smith & Wesson Model 61 (also known as the Smith & Wesson Escort or simply the Pocket Escort) is a subcompact semi-automatic pistol chambered in .22 Long Rifle and designed for self-defense, and was made from 1970 to 1973.

Design
The S&W Model 61 is a blowback-operated pistol chambered in .22 Long Rifle based upon the Bayard 1908 (Pieper Bayard) pistol. It was marketed for self-defense to fill a void in the pocket auto market after the banning of importation of small, concealable handguns. The pistol was available in blued or nickel-plated finishes and black or white plastic grip panels. Early models had numerous reliability problems, and according to Smith & Wesson historian, Jim Supica, many were returned to the factory for repair.

According to Supica, many of these returned pistols were not actually repaired. Employees at Smith & Wesson simply took a new pistol off the line, restamped the serial number, and shipped the pistol to the customer in place of the old one because repair time would have been too costly.
Model 61 engineering changes:

 61 (B1,001–B7,800; March 1970) Die-cast aluminum frame
 61-1 (B7,801–B9,850): Magazine safety (May 1970)
 61-1 (B1–B500): Special group of pres. numbers (1970)
 61-2 (B9,851–B40,000): Barrel nut added (September 1970)
 61-3 (B40,001–B65,438): Forged aluminum frame (July 1971)

References

External links
 Owner's Manual

Smith & Wesson semi-automatic pistols
.22 LR pistols